Offutt Pinion (March 23, 1910 – September 30, 1976) was an American sport shooter who competed in the 1956 Summer Olympics winning a bronze medal in the 50 m pistol event. He lived at various times in San Francisco, New Jersey, Ohio, and Kentucky.

According to the official Olympics website:

References

1910 births
1976 deaths
American male sport shooters
United States Distinguished Marksman
ISSF pistol shooters
Shooters at the 1956 Summer Olympics
Olympic bronze medalists for the United States in shooting
Medalists at the 1956 Summer Olympics
People from Floyd County, Kentucky
Sportspeople from Kentucky
20th-century American people